Bay Bolton or Brown Lusty (1705–1736) was a British Thoroughbred racehorse who won Queen Anne's Gold Cup as a five-year-old in 1710. After retiring from racing he became a successful sire for the Charles Paulet, 2nd Duke of Bolton, and his son Charles Powlett, 3rd Duke of Bolton, was Champion sire seven times.

Background
Bay Bolton (originally called Brown Lusty) was a brown or bay colt foaled in 1705. Bred by Sir Matthew Pierson, he was a son of Grey Hautboy and a Makeless mare.

Racing career

At York in 1710, Bay Bolton (then a five-year-old) beat eight six-year-olds to win Queen Anne's Gold Cup. In 1710 he also won the Subscription Purse at Middleham-Moor. He then walked 200 miles to run in, and win, the Rich Prize at Quainton-Meadow in Buckinghamshire. Bay Bolton was then bought by the Duke of Bolton, who sent him to Newmarket, where he won a match race against the Duke of Somerset's Wyndham and a match against Sir Matthew Pierson's Merlin. He also won two match races against Mr Frampton's Dragon.

Stud career
Bay Bolton was retired to stud where he became a very successful stallion, becoming Champion sire in 1724, 1726, 1727, 1729, 1732, 1733 and 1734. His progeny included Bonny Lass, Fearnought, Looby, Starling (a Champion sire) and Whitefoot. He died at the Duke of Bolton's stud at Bolton Hall in Yorkshire in 1736.

Pedigree

* Bay Bolton was inbred 4x4 to D'Arcy Yellow Turk. This means that the stallion appears twice in the fourth generation of his pedigree.

Sire line tree

Bay Bolton
Sloven
Whitefoot
Tortoise
Beau
Camillus
Bay Bolton Colt
Spark
Fearnought
Fearnought (Brother)
Starling
Starling (Ancaster)
Teazer
Teazer (Grisewood)
Torismond
Skim
Skim
Young Starling
Moro
Young Moro
Starling
Perseus
Bay Richmond
Clockfast
Verjuice
Syphax
Looby
Tryal
Patriot

References

1705 racehorse births
1736 racehorse deaths
British Champion Thoroughbred Sires
Racehorses bred in the United Kingdom
Racehorses trained in the United Kingdom
Thoroughbred family 37